Any Day Now is the first solo release by Goran Kralj. Goran was the lead singer with the Milwaukee-based rock band The Gufs.

Track listing
All tracks are by Goran Kralj 
"To Be Me" - 
"Don't Look Back" - 
"Closer You Get" - 3:56
"Ready To Fall" - 3:51
"Long Way Out" - 
"I'll Be Around" - 
"Easier Said" - 
"Look In The Mirror" - 4:12
"Don't (let the sun go down)" - 
"Stay" - 
"Until You're Gone" - 4:14

References
 

2000 albums
Goran Kralj albums